The Blue Anchor was a public house in Fishpool Street, St Albans, Hertfordshire, England. 
The pub occupied an eighteenth century building which was listed Grade II in 1971.

Fishpool Street was originally the main north west coach route out of St Albans, and the district has other historic pubs including The Six Bells. In 2015 the brewer McMullens said that it was difficult to find a tenant for the Blue Anchor. The building was later converted to residential use.

References

External links

Pubs in St Albans
Former pubs in Hertfordshire
Grade II listed buildings in Hertfordshire
Buildings and structures in St Albans